OuMuPo 2 is the seventh album by the turntablist, Rob Swift. It was released on October 19, 2004, by the French record label Ici, d'ailleurs... Records. It was produced by Rob Swift.

Track listing
"Trou Noir" - 3:53
"Annex 6" - 5:41
"Am All Wrong?" - 2:55
"1" - 8:36
"Infini V88" - 3:53
"Magree" - 2:03
"It Ain't No Funny At All" - 2:56
"Une Pluie Sèche" - 6:51
"Countryside" - 5:18

References

Rob Swift albums
2004 albums